Mike Bossio  (born 1960 or 1961) is a Canadian Liberal politician, who was elected to represent the riding of Hastings—Lennox and Addington in the House of Commons of Canada in the 2015 federal election and served until his defeat in the 2019 Canadian federal election.

Bossio earned a Bachelor of Arts degree in philosophy at York University.  Since 1989, he has operated Boscan Consultants Inc., a consulting business that handles recruitment for telecommunications firms.  From 1998 to 2000, he served as a councilor for Tyendinaga, Ontario.  Other notable political involvement included leading a 15-year fight to oppose the creation of a large landfill in Tyendinaga.

In the 2015 federal election, he defeated longtime Conservative incumbent Daryl Kramp in what was considered a major surprise of the evening.

In the 42nd Canadian Parliament, Bossio sat on the Aboriginal Affairs and Northern Development committee.

Electoral record

References

External links
 Official Website

Living people
Liberal Party of Canada MPs
Members of the House of Commons of Canada from Ontario
Ontario municipal councillors
York University alumni
21st-century Canadian politicians
Year of birth missing (living people)